was a lieutenant general in the Imperial Japanese Army and 3rd President of the Japanese Olympic Committee (1936–1937). He retired from the army in 1926 after 33 years of service.

Biography
Ōshima was a native of Saga Prefecture. He attended the 3rd class of the Imperial Japanese Army Academy ands commissioned as a second lieutenant in the cavalry in 1893. In 1911 he became commander of the IJA 4th Cavalry Regiment. He was promoted to colonel in September 1912, and in October 1913 commanded the IJA 6th Cavalry Regiment. He was promoted to major general in July 1918 and made commandant of the Cavalry School. In August 1922, Ōshima was promoted to lieutenant general. He was assigned command of the newly-formed IJA 14th Division in March 1926 and entered the reserves shortly thereafter.

Ōshima was chosen to head the Japanese equestrian team at the 1932 Summer Olympics in Los Angeles. One of his team members, Takeichi Nishi won the gold medal at this event for show jumping. Ōshima was later selected to become chairman of the Japanese Olympic Committee for the 1936 Summer Olympics in Berlin, and continued to be active in the promotion of Japanese sports to his death.

Decorations
 1901 –  Order of the Rising Sun, 4th class 
 1901 –  Order of the Golden Kite, 4th class

References

Footnotes

1872 births
1953 deaths
Members of the Japanese Olympic Committee
Japanese generals
People from Saga Prefecture
Recipients of the Order of the Rising Sun
Recipients of the Order of the Golden Kite